John Richardson Ellement (born January 10, 1957) is an American journalist. He has been a Metro reporter for The Boston Globe since 1986. He is known for his journalism both in The Boston Globe and online at Boston.com. He has covered Northern New England, Boston police, Massachusetts courts, and major breaking news stories for the Globe for the past 30 years.

Ellement grew up in South Buffalo, New York, and graduated from Northeastern University in 1981. Well-known news stories he has extensively covered include the so-called "Craigslist Killer", New England Patriot Nick Kaczur's drug use , abortion clinic killer John Salvi, Clark Rockefeller, the kidnapping and murder of Melissa Gosule, what became the national story of the arrest of Henry Louis Gates, and the 2013 Boston Marathon Bombings.

He also writes for The Boston Globes Home of the Week.

 Awards 
 In 2010, the Massachusetts Bar Association awarded him the Excellence in Legal Journalism award.
 He is a member of The Boston Globe staff who received the Pulitzer Prize for Breaking News Reporting' in 2014 for their work covering the 2013 Boston Marathon Bombings.

External links
 
 https://www.bostonglobe.com/staff/ellement

References

The Boston Globe people
American male journalists
1957 births
Living people
Writers from Buffalo, New York
Journalists from New York (state)